Ritorna il tenente Sheridan is an Italian television series in six episodes of the detective genre, produced in 1963 by RAI and centered around the figure of Lieutenant Sheridan, played by the actor Ubaldo Lay. It was created by screenwriters Mario Casacci, Alberto Ciambricco and Giuseppe Aldo Rossi, and directed by Mario Landi.

External links

References 

Italian television series
1963 Italian television series debuts
1960s Italian television series
RAI original programming